Mark Anton Airport , also known as Mark Anton Municipal Airport, is a public airport located four miles (6 km) east of the central business district of Dayton, a city in Rhea County, Tennessee, United States. It is owned by the City of Dayton.

Facilities and aircraft 
For the 12-month period ending November 12, 1998, the airport had 11,200 aircraft operations, an average of 30 per day: 99% general aviation and 1% military.

References

External links 
Mark Anton Municipal Airport page at City of Dayton website
Mark Anton Airport page at Tennessee DOT Airport Directory

Airports in Tennessee
Buildings and structures in Rhea County, Tennessee
Transportation in Rhea County, Tennessee